Traum (German for "dream") may refer to:

Businesses and organizations
 Traum (marque), a Chinese automobile marque owned by Zotye

Music

Record labels
 Traum Schallplatten, Cologne-based German minimal techno record label

Songs
 Der Traum, musical pantomime in two acts, MH 84, Michael Haydn and Florian Reichssiegel
 "Traum", song by Franz Berwald (1796-1868) 
 "Traum", song by Franz Schreker (1878-1934) 
 "Der Traum", D213 (Holty) by Schubert
 "Nacht und Träume", D827 by Schubert
 "Der Traum", Op. 29 No. 2 by Sigismond Thalberg (1812-1871) 
 "Der Traum", Op. 21 by János Fusz (1777-1819)
 "Ein Traum", song by Mathilde von Kralik
 "Ein Traum", song by Edvard Grieg
 "Traum" (Cro song), 2014 single by German rapper Cro
 "DJ Traum", 1999 single by the German synthpop band Melotron, taken from album Mörderwerk

People
 Artie Traum (1943–2008), American New Age guitarist, producer and songwriter
 Dick Traum, founder of the Achilles Track Club for disabled athletes
 Happy Traum (born 1938), American folk musician

See also
 Trauma (disambiguation)